The dragons play a significant role in the legendary accounts of Meitei folklore, Meitei literature, Meitei mythology and Meitei religion (Sanamahism) of Ancient Kangleipak (Ancient Manipur), Medieval Kangleipak (Medieval Manipur) and Modern Kangleipak (Modern Manipur).

List 

The Hiyang Hiren is a well furnished race boat. This is often built in the shape of a dragon. Many legends say that it possesses spiritual powers.
Kangla Sha is the Guardian dragon lion, safeguarding the Kangla Palace. Kangla Sha are usually depicted in pairs. 
Nongshaba, the dragon lion, is a child of Atingkok, the Supreme Being. Unlike his siblings, he always remains in the form of the mythical beast rather than that of a God (human figure).
Pakhangba is the youngest son of Leimarel Sidabi, the supreme mother earth goddess. He was given the throne of the universe to protect and rule the world by Atingkok, his father. He could change himself into both a serpentine dragon and a human. Several legends revolve around his identity as an ancient historical figure.
Poubi Lai is the tyrant dragon serpent of the primitive Loktak Lake. This huge dragon is a popular figure in Meitei folklore and mythology.
Taoroinai is a mythical dragon serpent, who lives in the cosmic ocean. It is known for bringing down the divine celestial egg (nonglum) down to earth.

Gallery

See also 
 Chinese dragon
 European dragon
 Japanese dragon
 Korean dragon

References 

Meitei culture
Meitei dragons
Meitei folklore
Meitei mythology